Bethapudi is a village in West Godavari district in the state of Andhra Pradesh in India.

Demographics
 India census, Bethapudi has a population of 3326 of which 1665 are males while 1661 are females. The average sex ratio of Bethapudi village is 998. The child population is 349, which makes up 10.49% of the total population of the village, with sex ratio 876. In 2011, the literacy rate of Bethapudi village was 81.93% when compared to 67.02% of Andhra Pradesh.

See also 
 Eluru

References 

Villages in West Godavari district